The Nun and the Bandit is an Australian film directed by Paul Cox.

Plot summary
In the 1940s, two outlaw brothers kidnap their wealthy 14-year-old second cousin, but things get complicated when her chaperoning nun refuses to abandon her charge.

Production
The film was made with finance from Film Victoria and the FFC. It was shot near Bacchus Marsh, Maldon in Victoria.

Release
According to Ozmovies: 
Roadshow was the nominal domestic distributor but refused to release it. The film went straight to video, though it had a small theatrical release in Canada thanks to Alliance.

The film was screened at the short-lived Halls Gap Film Festival in the Grampians on Sunday, 8 November 1992, with Cox present, though it had also had a "world premiere" at the Melbourne Film Festival earlier in the year.

Cox called the movie "minimal filmmaking":
It's the very first time I read a book that I wanted to film, because I normally don't believe the film has much to do with the novel. I wasn't at the screening at the Melbourne Film Festival but I never want to screen a film at a festival again. That screening actually killed the release. It got bad reviews in a few places, so Roadshow wouldn't even release it. I think that as an Australian bush film, it is a very, very original film, a highly original piece. The forest, the beauty of the land, that's the altar, and the sacrifice is the innocence and youth. You have a sacrifice on an altar. But it gave me enormous satisfaction because the finished film is very nicely tuned, minimal when you look at the way it's crafted... But that's not what the reviewers want, a bush film like this. That's not very Australian, is it?

References

External links

The Nun and the Bandit at Ozmovies

1992 films
Australian drama films
Films about Catholic nuns
Films directed by Paul Cox
1990s English-language films
1990s Australian films